Rubrobacter is a genus of Actinomycetota. It is radiotolerant and may rival Deinococcus radiodurans in this regard.

Phylogeny
The currently accepted taxonomy is based on the List of Prokaryotic names with Standing in Nomenclature (LPSN)  and National Center for Biotechnology Information (NCBI)
and the phylogeny is based on 16S rRNA-based LTP release 111 by 'The All-Species Living Tree' Project

See also
Catacombs#Bacteria
Polyextremophile

References

External links

Rubrobacterales
Actinomycetota
Bacteria genera